Red Wood Pigeon is a 1989 Italian comedy drama film written and directed by Nanni Moretti.

The film won the Nastro d'Argento for best original story.

Plot summary 

Michele Apicella, an MP for the Italian Communist Party, is involved in a car accident and consequently loses his memory. Michele is also a player for the Monteverde water polo team; he joins the team on a trip to play an important match in Sicily which will decide who wins the league, despite being uncertain of his own identity. The match lasts all day and well into the night, and throughout, Michele engages in conversations with other players, a trade unionist, the referee, a Catholic, a journalist and his daughter, in an attempt to reconstruct his sense of self. It becomes apparent that earlier in the week, he had given a momentous speech, the content of which he cannot remember. As the match drags on, the spectators and players become increasingly engrossed by the film Doctor Zhivago, which is playing on a TV screen in the bar. Michele misses a penalty and the match ends; he is left feeling disappointed not just with the match, but with life. Driving back to Rome with his daughter, he loses control of his car and the film ends with a dream-like sequence as a crowd gathers on a hill, looking up to the sun.

Cast 

Nanni Moretti as  Michele Apicella 
Silvio Orlando as  Mario
Mariella Valentini as  the journalist
Marco Messeri as  Michele's father
 Luisanna Pandolfi  as  Michele's mother
Asia Argento as  Valentina
Fabio Traversa as Michele's friend
Raoul Ruiz as  the guru

References

External links

1989 films
Italian comedy-drama films
Films directed by Nanni Moretti
1989 comedy-drama films
Water polo films
Films scored by Nicola Piovani
1980s Italian-language films
1980s Italian films